Forrest is a masculine given name. Notable persons with the name include:
Forrest (singer) (1953–2013), born Forrest Thomas, American singer popular in the UK and Netherlands
Forrest J. Ackerman (1916–2008), American magazine editor, writer, and collector
Forrest Adair (1865–1936), real estate dealer
Forrest Aguirre (born 1969), American fantasy and horror author
 Forrest Clare Allen, better known as Phog Allen (1885–1974), American basketball coach
Forrest H. Anderson (1913–1989), 17th Governor of Montana
Forrest Baugher (1934–2017), American politician, former Washington state representative
Forrest Beaty (born 1944), American track and field athlete
Forrest Behm (1919–2015), American football player
Forrest Bess (1911–1977), American painter and eccentric visionary
Forrest Bird (1921–2015), American aviator, inventor, and biomedical engineer
Forrest Blue (1945–2011), American football player
George Forrest Browne (1833–1930), English bishop
Forrest Burmeister (1913–1997), American football player
Forrest Church (1948–2009), Unitarian Universalist minister, author, and theologian
Forrest Claypool (born 1958), American politician, president of the Chicago Transit Authority
Forrest Compton (1925–2020), American actor
 Forrest B. Cox, better known as Frosty Cox (1908–1962), American basketball coach
Forrest Craver (1875–1958), American college football player, coach and athletic director
Forrest DeBernardi (1899–1970), American basketball player
Forrest Dewar (1748–1817), Scottish surgeon
Forrest C. Donnell (1884–1980), U.S. Senator and 40th Governor of Missouri
Forrest Douds (1905–1979), American football player
Forrest F. Dryden (1864–1932), president of Prudential Insurance Company of America (now Prudential Financial)
Forrest Dunbar (born 1984), American politician and attorney
Forrest England (1912–2002), American football coach and college athletic administrator
Forrest E. Everhart (1922–1986), United States Army soldier
Forrest Fezler (1949–2018), American golf course design consultant and golfer
Forrest Fulton (1846–1926), British judge and Conservative politician
Forrest Gainer (born 1979), Canadian rugby player
Forrest Galante (born 1988), American wildlife biologist and television personality
Forrest Gander (born 1956), American poet, essayist, novelist, critic, and translator
Forrest Goodluck (born 1998), American actor 
Forrest Goodwin (1862–1913), United States Representative from Maine
Forrest Gregg (1933–2019), American football player and coach
Forrest Griffin (born 1979), American mixed martial artist
Forrest Griffith (1928–2007), American football player
Forrest M. Hall (1869–1961), American football player and coach
Forrest Halsey (1877–1949), American screenwriter
Forrest Hamer (born 1956), American poet, psychologist, and psychoanalyst
Forrest Hamilton (born 1931), American basketball player
Forrest Kline (born 1983), lead singer, songwriter and guitarist of Hellogoodbye
Forrest Knox (born 1956), Republican member of the Kansas Senate
Forrest Lake (politician) (1868–1939), politician, banker, real estate investor, and member of the Florida House of Representatives
Forrest Lamp (born 1994), American football player
 Forrest Everett Pettengill (born 1973), American child actor
Forrest Lewis (1899–1977), American actor
Forrest Li (born 1977/78), Singaporean billionaire businessman
Forrest McClendon, American stage actor, singer, and professor
Forrest McPherson (1911–1989), American football player
Forrest Mars Sr. (1904–1999), driving force of the Mars candy empire
Forrest Mars Jr. (1931–2016), son of Forrest Mars, Sr. and one of the wealthiest people in the world
Forrest David Matthews (born 1935), American politician
Forrest McDonald (1927–2016), American historian
Forrest Merrill (born 1996), American football player
Forrest Mims (born 1944), American amateur scientist, magazine columnist, and author
Forrest S. Mosten (born 1947), American lawyer
Forrest Myers (born 1941), American sculptor
Forrest O'Connor (born 1988), American singer-songwriter, mandolinist, and entrepreneur
Forrest Parry (1921–2005), IBM engineer
Forrest E. Peden (1913–1945), United States Army soldier
Forrest S. Petersen (1922–1990), United States Navy aviator and test pilot
Forrest Petz (born 1975), American mixed martial artist
Forrest Phillips (1887–1972), farmer and political figure on Prince Edward Island
Forrest Pogue (1912–1996), official United States Army historian during World War II
Forrest Preston (born 1933), American billionaire businessman
Forrest Pritchard (born 1974), American sustainable farmer and writer
Forrest Redlich, Australian writer/producer of films and TV
Forrest O. Rednour (1923–1943), United States Coast Guardsman
Forrest Reid (1875–1947), Irish novelist, literary critic, and translator
Forrest Rhyne (born 1999), American football player
Forrest L. Richardson (born 1959), American golf course architect
Forrest B. Royal (1893–1945), member of the United States Naval Academy class of 1915
Forrest Sawyer (born 1940), American broadcast journalist
Forrest W. Seymour (1905–1983), American journalist
Forrest C. Shaklee (1894–1985), American nutritionist, founder of Shaklee Corporation
Forrest Sherman (1896–1951), U.S. Navy admiral and Chief of Naval Operations
Forrest Shreve (1878–1950), American botanist
Forrest Smith (1886–1962), 42nd Governor of Missouri
Forrest Smithson (1884–1962), American hurdler and 1908 Olympic gold medalist
Forrest Sprowl (1919–1988), American basketball player and coach
Forrest Stanley (1889–1969), American actor and screenwriter
Forrest Taylor (1883–1965), American character actor
Forrest Thompson (1918–1979), baseball player
Forrest Towns (1914–1991), American track and field athlete, 1936 Olympic gold medalist 
Forrest Tucker (1919–1986), American actor
Forrest Tucker (criminal) (1920–2004), American career criminal
Forrest Twogood (1907–1972), American baseball player, college basketball and baseball coach, and college athletics administrator
Forrest L. Vosler (1923–1992), Boeing B-17 Flying Fortress radio operator
Forrest Ward (born 1949), American amateur heavyweight boxer
Forrest Wall (born 1995), American professional baseball player
Forrest White (1920–1994), American musical instruments industry executive
Forrest Wilson (1883–1942), American author and journalist
Forrest L. Wood (1932–2020), American fisher and boat builder, founder of Ranger Boats

Fictional characters 
Forrest, a playable character in the tactical role-playing video game Fire Emblem Fates
Forrest Gates, a minor character in Season 4 of Buffy the Vampire Slayer
Forrest Gump (character), the titular character of the 1986 novel and 1994 movie adaptation

English masculine given names